"John Deere Green" is a song written by Dennis Linde, and recorded by American country music artist Joe Diffie.  It was released in November 1993 as the third single from his album Honky Tonk Attitude.  The song peaked at number 5 on the country charts.

Content
The song is a moderate up-tempo describing a young man named Billy Bob, who is in love with a young woman named Charlene, both of whom met in high school. One late summer evening, Billy Bob hauls a can of "John Deere green" paint to the top of a water tower and paints the words "Billy Bob loves Charlene," as well as an outline of a heart, on the tower, as a means of professing his affection towards Charlene. The second verse describes the two of them raising a family on an 80-acre farm they purchased (with a front yard from which Billy Bob's water tower decorations are viewable), while the bridge reveals that the heart and words continue to remain intact on the tower, despite numerous attempts from the town to paint over them.

Release
For the single release, Epic Records had Diffie re-record "John Deere Green" for commercial and airplay release. The re-recorded version included a slightly altered rearrangement, more commercial-pop sound, as well as re-recorded vocals.  To date, the "Edited" version has only been released via cassette tape and 7" single.

Music video
Though one of the album's biggest hits, a music video was not commissioned for the single.

Other versions
The most notable later version of the song is by the Norwegian band Hellbillies. Their version, "Bondeblå" (a light blue color named after the farmers' blue overalls) from the album Drag (1996) tells about a boy on his first time service in the Norwegian military who insists on wearing a blue knitted sweater and matching hat that his mother knitted for him over his uniform, and how the other soldiers mistreat him, making him do their chores and bugging him consistently. However, in time he turns out fine and ends up as a highly ranked officer in the Norwegian army.

American Aquarium covered the song on their 2021 album Slappers, Bangers, and Certified Twangers: Vol 1.

Formats and track listings
These are the formats and track listings of major single releases of "John Deere Green":

US Vinyl, 7", Single, 45 RPM, Cassette
 "John Deere Green"  – 3:36
 "Somewhere Under the Rainbow" – 4:16

Chart positions

Year-end charts

References

[  Allmusic]

1993 singles
1993 songs
Joe Diffie songs
Songs written by Dennis Linde
John Deere
Song recordings produced by Bob Montgomery (songwriter)
Epic Records singles